Term limits in Russia are limitations set by the Constitution of Russia that limit how long an individual may hold a specific political office in Russia. The Russian government uses consecutive term limits, requiring officeholders to leave office after term limits have been reached, but allowing them to seek the office again after one term of separation. The President of Russia is limited to no more than two consecutive six year terms, and governors of all federal subjects are limited to no more than two consecutive five year terms.

President Vladimir Putin has caused concern by circumventing constitutional term limits. While Putin was ineligible for the presidency in 2008, he maintained de facto rule over the country from the office of Prime Minister. Putin would have again been ineligible for the 2024 Russian presidential election, but a 2020 amendment to the Constitution of Russia exempted Putin from presidential term limits until 2036.

Presidential term limits 
In 1990, Article 6 of the Soviet Constitution was amended to establish the office of President of the Soviet Union. This amendment set a limit of two terms on the presidency. This term limit was never reached, however, as the dissolution of the Soviet Union occurred in 1991 while President Mikhail Gorbachev was still serving in his first term.

The Constitution of Russia was adopted in 1993, limiting the President of Russia to no more than two consecutive four year terms. Boris Yeltsin was the incumbent president when the constitution came into effect and had already served for over two years. Yelstin was reelected in 1996, but he resigned near the end of his term in 1999, and Prime Minister Vladimir Putin served for the remainder of Yeltsin's term as acting president. Putin was elected to a full term in 2000 and reelected in 2004.

Putin was not constitutionally permitted to run for reelection in 2008, so he endorsed First Deputy Prime Minister Dmitry Medvedev, who went on to become the next president. The day after Medvedev's inauguration, he appointed Putin as Prime Minister of Russia. While Putin did not hold the office of president for the following four years, he held de facto control over the country's executive, extending his tenure beyond what term limits would normally allow.

The Constitution was amended in 2008, expanding the presidential term from four to six years following the 2012 election. Having been removed from the office of the presidency for a term, Putin was constitutionally eligible to run again and was elected president in 2012 and then reelected in 2018. The Constitution was amended in 2020 to reset the number of terms Putin has served, allowing him to circumvent term limits in the 2024 and 2030 elections, enabling him to legally stay in office until 2036.

Subject term limits 
In 1999, governors of Russian subjects were limited to two terms. This law was reinterpreted in 2001 so that terms before the 1999 law did not count toward a governor's term limit. Putin enforced these term limits on governors depending on their loyalty to his agenda. Governors were nominally limited to two terms, but this was only enforced against governors that were not subservient to Putin. In 2004, the direct election of governors was abolished in favor of appointments, effectively abolishing term limits as well.

The law was changed in 2015, once again allowing the direct election of governors in Russia and limiting them to no more than two consecutive five year terms. In 2021, the federal government of Russia began working toward abolishing these term limits.

Historical term limits 
The earliest term limits in Russia were established in the Novgorod Republic for the office of posadnik, which shared executive power with the duke. A similar office was also found in the Pskov Republic a century later. Russian monarchs and Soviet premiers were not subject to term limits.

See also 
 List of political term limits

References

Bibliography 
 
 

Term limits
Politics of Russia